Philippe Almeida Costa (born 1 March 2000), simply known as Philippe, is a Brazilian professional footballer who plays as a forward for Goiás.

Professional career
Batata began playing senior football with Vila Nova Futebol Clube in the Campeonato Goiano in 2018. On 16 May 2018, Philippe signed with the Swiss club FC Sion. Philippe made his professional debut with FC Sion in a 4-2 Swiss Super League win over FC St. Gallen on 29 July 2018.

References

External links
 
 SFL Profile
 FC Sion Profile

2000 births
Living people
Sportspeople from Goiânia
Brazilian footballers
Vila Nova Futebol Clube players
FC Sion players
Sharjah FC players
Grêmio Esportivo Anápolis players
Goiás Esporte Clube players
Swiss Super League players
UAE Pro League players
Campeonato Brasileiro Série D players
Association football forwards
Brazilian expatriate footballers
Brazilian expatriate sportspeople in Switzerland
Brazilian expatriate sportspeople in the United Arab Emirates
Expatriate footballers in Switzerland
Expatriate footballers in the United Arab Emirates